Orders Are Orders is a 1955 British comedy film directed by David Paltenghi, and featuring Brian Reece, Peter Sellers, Sid James, Tony Hancock, Raymond Huntley, and Bill Fraser. Eric Sykes contributed to the script and appears in a minor role. It was a remake of the film Orders Is Orders (1933), itself based on the play Orders Are Orders by Ian Hay and Anthony Armstrong.

Plot
A film production company decides to make a new space adventure film close to an army barracks, using the soldiers as extras. This does not go down well with the commanding officer, who attempts to make life as difficult as possible for the film crew.

Cast
 Brian Reece — Captain Harper
 Margot Grahame — Wanda Sinclair
 Raymond Huntley — Colonel Bellamy
 Sid James — Ed Waggermeyer
 Tony Hancock — Lt Wilfred Cartroad, the bandmaster
 Peter Sellers — Private Goffin
 Clive Morton — General Sir Cuthbert Grahame-Foxe
 June Thorburn — Veronica Bellamy
 Maureen Swanson — Joanne Delamere
 Peter Martyn — Lieutenant Broke
 Bill Fraser — Private Slee
 Edward Lexy — Captain Ledger
 Barry MacKay — RSM Benson
 Maureen Pryor —Miss Marigold
 Donald Pleasence — Lance Corporal Martin
 Eric Sykes — Private Waterhouse
 Gerald Campion — Private Johnson
 Leonard Williams  — Corporal Smithers

Media releases
The film was released on region two DVD in 2007.

Critical reception
TV Guide wrote, "except for a couple of decent comic performances, the good cast, including both Peter Sellers and Donald Pleasence in early roles, are wasted by the film's haphazard construction."
Time Out wrote, "just about worth suffering to see Tony Hancock in his film debut as the harassed bandmaster."

References

External links 
 

1955 films
1955 comedy films
British comedy films
Films based on works by Ian Hay
Films shot at Beaconsfield Studios
British Lion Films films
1950s English-language films
1950s British films
British black-and-white films